H. Wesley Balk (October 31, 1932 – March 21, 2003) was an American performance theorist/coach and stage director. He was artistic director of the Minnesota Opera for almost twenty years, where he directed several world premieres, including Conrad Susa's Transformations.

He authored several books on performance, including The Complete Singer-Actor and The Radiant Performer.

Sources
Hahn, Trudi, "H. Wesley Balk, opera director, dies at 70; The Minnesota Opera's creative leader helped develop an American style of operatic performance", Star Tribune, 22 March 2003 (accessed via subscription 11 June 2010)

Opera America, Transformations, North American Works Directory (accessed 6 June 2010)

External links

1932 births
2003 deaths
American opera directors
American theatre directors